Balnot-sur-Laignes is a commune in the Aube department in the Grand Est region of north-central France.

The inhabitants of the commune are known as Balnotiers or Balnotières.

The commune has been awarded one flower by the National Council of Towns and Villages in Bloom in the Competition of cities and villages in Bloom.

Geography
Balnot-sur-Laignes is located some 35 km south-east of Troyes and 10 km south of Bar-sur-Seine. Access to the commune is by the D452 road from Polisy in the north which passes down the eastern side of the commune just east of the village and continues south to Les Riceys. The D26 comes from Neuville-sur-Seine in the east and passes through the village continuing south-west to Bagneux-la-Fosse. The D184 from Avirey-Lingey passes through the western arm of the commune going north-west to join the D36. The commune is farmland in the east and west with a belt of dense forest through the centre.

The Laignes river forms the eastern border of the commune as it flows north to join the Seine at Polisy.

Neighbouring communes and villages

History
During the French revolution the commune, which had been called Balnot-le-Châtel, changed its name to Balnot-sur-Laignes.

Administration

List of Successive Mayors

Demography
In 2017 the commune had 155 inhabitants.

Sites and monuments
A War Memorial for French Pacifists with the inscription "Maudite soit la guerre" (Cursed be war).

The Parish Church contains many items that are registered as historical monuments:

A Painting: the three Mary (19th century)
2 banks of Pews (18th century)
A Sculpture (1629)
A Painting: The Annunciation (19th century)
A Retable (18th century)
A Stall (18th century)
A Baptismal font (19th century)
2 Door Panels (16th century)
A Sculpture: Christ on the Cross (16th century)
A Tombstone for Pierre-Louis Bourgeois (1771)
The main Altar and Retable (18th century)
Statues (16th century)
A Group Sculpture: Education of the Virgin (16th century)
A Group Sculpture: Education of the Virgin (16th century)
The Furniture in the Church

See also
Communes of the Aube department

References

External links

Balnot le Châtel on the 1750 Cassini Map

Communes of Aube